The Mazda Kiyora is a concept car made by Mazda. It was first introduced at the 2008 Paris Motor Show. It is the next generation urban compact car intended to replace the Mazda2. It is a design study for next-generation compact car and also an engineering study of high fuel efficiency gasoline engine. The design theme of the Mazda Kiyora is water. It is applied to a city, a new trend in the automotive market due to environmental concerns. The Mazda Kiyora achieves 32 km/L of fuel efficiency and 90g/km of  emission.

Styling

Design
The Kiyora, meaning “clean and pure”, is designed for young city drivers. The design of the Mazda Kiyora is a collaborative work between Mazda Europe and Mazda Japan.

Exterior
The Mazda Kiyora has two butterfly doors and a tailgate. It has four seats and the rear two seats can be folded. The body frame is streamlined like Mazda's former concept car the Nagare series. The roof and two side doors are made with transparent material so you can see the monocoque & frame structure from the outside. It is designed not only to look like water stream, but also to increase the safety while decreasing the weight.

Interior
The dashboard inside the car uses a touch screen technology. The driver can move and organize the icons including all the meters and audio system on the display.
One notable feature of Mazda Kiyora is its roof. The roof is designed to collect rain water and purify it through an installed filter. The water is saved in a bottle installed in the car so that passengers can drink it.

Technology

Engine

The Mazda Kiyora uses a 1.3-liter gasoline-powered four-cylinder direct-injection engine. The engine employs Mazda's unique idle reduction technology called “i-stop” and a more efficient six-speed automatic transmission. Mazda's “i-stop” system saves fuel in stop and go urban traffic by shutting down the engine automatically when the vehicle is stationary and restarting quickly and quietly. The Mazda Kiyora also uses deceleration energy to charge the battery.

Body and Fuel Efficiency
To minimize its weight, the body frame is all carbon fiber. Mazda also uses lightweight materials for interiors. These new materials make the Mazda Kiyora 100 kg lighter than the current Mazda2. These technologies enable the Mazda Kiyora to perform 32 km/L of mileage. It will have the highest fuel efficiency of gasoline engine cars when it goes into production. The Mazda Kiyora also produces less than 90g/km of  emission.

References

External links
 Mazda Kiyora - Official Mazda Site
 Mazda Kiyora - Mazda Upcoming Models & Concept Cars

Kiyora